Terrazza Martini Tower (former name, formal name is Piacentini Tower) is a highrise building located in Genoa, Italy. Construction on the building began in 1935, and finished in 1940. It was designed by Marcello Piacentini and Angelo Invernizzi.
It has 31 floors, and contains office spaces. Its roof height is 108 m, and counting its spire, the full building height is 116 m.

At the time of construction it was the tallest building in Europe, until 1952, when the Kotelnicheskaya Embankment was built in Moscow.

See also
 List of tallest buildings in Genoa

References

Office buildings completed in 1940
Buildings and structures in Genoa
Skyscrapers in Genoa
Skyscraper office buildings in Italy